Luiz Henrique Tosta (born 1 June 1985), is a Brazilian footballer who plays for Corumbaense.

Club career
Luiz Henrique Tosta began his career playing for league clubs in Brazil, such as Botafogo, Platinense, Ceilândia, Palmas and Londrina. He also played for Deportivo Xinabajul in Guatemala.

Tosta moved to China and signed a contract with Guangdong Sunray Cave in 2010. He made his China League One debut on 25 April.

Tosta returned to Brazil to play for Inter de Santa Maria. He had one year playing for São Paulo teams, having played three months in South Korea where he did not achieve great success, in 2014 he moved to S.E. Itapirense to compete in the Paulista championship serieA2 and immediately had an offer to return to play in Guatemala where he was the champion of the opening tournament and then champion of champions of the first division of Guatemala. His new team was CD Petapa, champion of Apertura 2013 Guatemala first division, where the athlete won his first title of the season and his third in the country, Copa Amistad oF Guatemala 2014 where the team will win CSD Suchitepequez by the score 3-1.

Honours 
Corumbaense
 Campeonato Sul-Mato-Grossense: 2017

References

Sources 
 
 
 
 
 
 
 
 
 

1985 births
Living people
Brazilian footballers
Brazilian expatriate sportspeople in China
Expatriate footballers in China
China League One players
União Bandeirante Futebol Clube players
Associação Botafogo Futebol Clube players
Ceilândia Esporte Clube players
Palmas Futebol e Regatas players
Londrina Esporte Clube players
Guangdong Sunray Cave players
Esporte Clube Internacional players
Sertãozinho Futebol Clube players
Riograndense Futebol Clube players
América Futebol Clube (SP) players
Sport Club Rio Grande players
Sociedade Esportiva Itapirense players
Rio Preto Esporte Clube players
Esporte Clube São Luiz players
Corumbaense Futebol Clube players
Association football defenders
Footballers from Curitiba